Jang Hyung-Seok (born 7 July 1972) is a South Korean football player.

He played for several clubs, including Ulsan Hyundai Horang-i, Anyang LG Cheetahs and Bucheon SK.

He played for the South Korea national football team and was a participant at the 1998 FIFA World Cup.

Club career statistics

International goals
Results list South Korea's goal tally first.

External links
 
 National Team Player Record 
 
 

1972 births
Living people
Association football defenders
South Korean footballers
South Korea international footballers
Ulsan Hyundai FC players
FC Seoul players
Jeju United FC players
K League 1 players
1998 FIFA World Cup players